The Coupe de France's results of the 1965–66 season. RC Strasbourg won the final played on May 22, 1966, beating FC Nantes.

Round of 16

Quarter-finals

Semi-finals

Final

References

French federation

1965–66 domestic association football cups
1965–66 in French football
1965-66